The 16th District of the Iowa Senate is located in southern Iowa, and is currently composed of Polk County.

Current elected officials
Nate Boulton is the senator currently representing the 16th District.

The area of the 16th District contains two Iowa House of Representatives districts:
The 31st District (represented by Rick Olson)
The 32nd District (represented by Ruth Ann Gaines)

The district is also located in Iowa's 3rd congressional district, which is represented by Cindy Axne.

Past senators
The district has previously been represented by:

Dale Tieden, 1983–1992
Lyle Zieman, 1993–2000
Mark Zieman, 2001–2002
Julie Hosch, 2003–2004
Tom Hancock, 2005–2012
Dick Dearden, 2013–2016
Nate Boulton, 2017–present

See also
Iowa General Assembly
Iowa Senate

References

16